She Was Too Good to Me is an album by Chet Baker. The album was released in 1974 as what some would call a "comeback" album. The title track is an alteration of "He Was Too Good to Me". There were three recording sessions (July 17, October 31, and November 1, 1974).

Reception 

The Allmusic review by Scott Yanow states "Baker began his comeback after five years of musical inactivity with this excellent CTI date. ... Altoist Paul Desmond is a major asset on two songs and the occasional strings give variety to this fine session".

Track listing

Personnel
Chet Baker – trumpet, vocals
Hubert Laws – flute and alto flute
Bob James  –  electric piano
Ron Carter – bass
Steve Gadd – drums on "Autumn Leaves", "She Was Too Good to Me", "Funk in Deep Freeze", "Tangerine", "My Future Just Passed"
Jack DeJohnette  – drums on "With a Song in My Heart", "What'll I Do?", "It's You or No One"
Paul Desmond – alto saxophone on "Autumn Leaves", "Tangerine"
Romeo Penque – flute, clarinet
George Marge – alto flute, oboe d'amore
David Friedman – vibes
Don Sebesky – arrangements
Rudy Van Gelder – engineer, recorder

References

External links
Chet Baker - Lost and Found
Chet Baker Tribute
Chet Baker Foundation

Chet Baker albums
1974 albums
Albums arranged by Don Sebesky
Albums produced by Creed Taylor
CTI Records albums
Albums recorded at Van Gelder Studio